Coors Light Cycling Team was an elite road bicycle racing cycling team in the United States. The team was very prominent in races held in the United States, but they did not achieve many other major results.

1994 team roster
As at 1 January 1994:

Major results

Results:
1989
 Philly Cycling Classic, Greg Oravetz
  National Road Race Championships, Greg Oravetz
1990
 Stages 10 & 13 Tour DuPont, Michel Zanoli
 Reading Classic, David Farmer
 Overall Killington Stage Race, Greg Oravetz
Stage 2, Michel Zanoli
Stage 3, Greg Oravetz
1991
 Overall Cascade Cycling Classic, Greg Oravetz
 Stage 1 Tour DuPont, Davis Phinney
 Thrift Drug Classic, Michael Engleman
 Nevada City Classic, Chris Huber
  National Criterium Championships, Greg Oravetz
 Overall Killington Stage Race, Roy Knickmann
Stage 3, Roy Knickmann 
Stage 5, Scott Moninger
 Overall Herald Sun Tour, Michael Engleman
Stages 4 & 5, Michael Engleman
Stages 8 & 13, Greg Oravetz
1992
 Stages 3 & 12 Vuelta a Colombia, Roberto Gaggioli
 Stage 2 Tour DuPont, David Mann
 Stage 10 Tour DuPont, Alexi Grewal
 Overall West-Virginia Classic, Scott Moninger
Prologue, Greg Oravetz
 Overall Tour of the Adirondacks, Michael Engleman
Stage 3, Stephen Swart
 Nevada City Classic, Michael Engleman
 Overall Casper Classic, Michael Engleman
Stage 1, David Mann
Stages 2 & 6, Michael Engleman
Stage 3 (TTT)
  National Criterium Championships, Stephen Swart
 Overall Celestial Bicycle Classic, Michael Engleman
Stages 1 & 2, Stephen Swart
Stage 3, Michael Engleman
Stage 4, David Mann
Stage 5, Davis Phinney
 Overall Killington Stage Race, Scott Moninger
Prologue, David Mann
Stage 1, Davis Phinney
Stages 2 & 4, Scott Moninger
 Satges 10 & 11 Herald Sun Tour, Stephen Swart
1993
 Stage 7 Tour DuPont, Ron Kiefel
 Nevada City Classic, Alexi Grewal
 Reading Classic, Roberto Gaggioli
 Overall Killington Stage Race, Michael Engleman
Prologue , Michael Engleman
Stages 2 & 4, Scott Moninger
 Overall Herald Sun Tour, David Mann
Stages 1 & 8, David Mann
Stage 11, Stephen Swart
Stage 12, Scott Moninger
 Overall Australian Alpine Classic, Roberto Gaggioli
Stage 1, Roberto Gaggioli
Stage 2 & 5, Scott Moninger
1994
 Overall Cascade Cycling Classic, Michael Engleman
 Stage 5 West-Virginia Classic, Scott Moninger
 Nevada City Classic, Scott Moninger
 Reading Classic, Ron Kiefel
 Overall Killington Stage Race, Michael Engleman
Prologue & Stage 2, Michael Engleman
Stage 1, David Mann

References

Defunct cycling teams based in the United States
Cycling teams established in 1989
Cycling teams disestablished in 1994
1994 disestablishments in the United States
1989 establishments in the United States